Cristel Vahtra (born 20 March 1972) is an Estonian cross-country skier who competed from 1994 to 2001. Her best World Cup finish was 22nd in a 10 km event in Russia in 1996.

Vahtra also competed in two Winter Olympics, earning her best finish of 27th in the 5 km event at Lillehammer in 1994. Her best finish at the FIS Nordic World Ski Championships was 17th in the 5 km event at Thunder Bay in 1995.

Cross-country skiing results
All results are sourced from the International Ski Federation (FIS).

Olympic Games

World Championships

World Cup

Season standings

References

External links

1972 births
Cross-country skiers at the 1994 Winter Olympics
Cross-country skiers at the 1998 Winter Olympics
Estonian female cross-country skiers
Living people
Olympic cross-country skiers of Estonia
People from Jõgeva County